The Copiah County School District is a public school district based in Copiah County, Mississippi (USA).

The district serves the communities of Crystal Springs, Wesson, Georgetown, and Beauregard.

Schools
Crystal Springs, Mississippi
Crystal Springs Elementary School
Crystal Springs Middle School
Crystal Springs High School
Wesson, Mississippi
Wesson Attendance Center

The student body at Crystal Springs High School is 81 percent African American, 9 percent Hispanic, and 9 percent white.

Demographics

2006-07 school year
There were a total of 2,914 students enrolled in the Copiah County School District during the 2006–2007 school year. The gender makeup of the district was 48% female and 52% male. The racial makeup of the district was 59.33% African American, 38.88% White, 1.65% Hispanic, and 0.14% Asian. 64.7% of the district's students were eligible to receive free lunch.

Previous school years

Accountability statistics

Alumni
Royce Whittington was a star football player whose career continued through college. He was drafted by the Green Bay Packers in 1960 but after gaining a lot of weight was cut immediately by Vince Lombardi.
Don "Scooter" Purvis running back at LSU including in 1958 championship team
Larry Grantham, Super Bowl III champion with the New York Jets.

See also
List of school districts in Mississippi

References

External links
Copiah County School District

Education in Copiah County, Mississippi
School districts in Mississippi
School districts in the Jackson metropolitan area, Mississippi